WDG is an acronym that might stand for:

 World Disc Games, a semi regular sports event.
 Wilhelm-Diess-Gymnasium, a senior high school in Pocking, Bavaria, Germany.
 Windows and Devices Group, a department from Microsoft; see Windows Insider